Marten Wilmots (born 29 January 1999 in Belgium) is a Belgian footballer.

Career
After failing to make an appearance for Standard Liège, one of Belgium's most successful clubs, Wilmots wanted to go abroad with U.S. Avellino 1912 in the Italian lower leagues but the transfer never happened.

In 2018, he signed for Ferencvárosi TC, the most successful Hungarian team, but failed to make an appearance there before joining NK Triglav Kranj in the Slovenian top flight.

He is the son of former Belgium international Marc.

References

External links
 

Belgian footballers
Living people
Association football midfielders
Association football forwards
1999 births
NK Triglav Kranj players